(IBU) is a private university in Katsuura, Chiba, Chiba Prefecture, Japan, established in 1984. The university has a specialized curriculum in physical education, specifically the budō Japanese martial arts, sports, and physical culture. In addition to martial arts training, the university also offer theoretical classes of various subjects and especially budō history.

History 
 International Budo University was established in 1984.
 Graduate school in International Budo University was established in 1996.

Organization

Faculties
 Department of Physical Education
 Department of Budo, includes:
judo
kendo
kyūdō
naginata
karate
shorinji kempo
aikido
 Department of Athletic Training
 Department of International Sport Culture

Graduate schools 
 Martial arts and physical culture of sports
 Sports medicine
 Coaching science
 Exercise and health

Special course 

The program, inaugurated in 1984, is limited to 20 students. The program follows the Japanese academic school year, which begins in April and ends in March. The Budo Specialization Program curriculum focuses primarily on the advanced study of judō or kendō study, and secondarily on the study of Japanese culture and the Japanese language. Students from non-English speaking countries can elect to study English in the second semester. Students can elect to live at the Matsumae Memorial International Exchange Hall, which is located on the campus in Katsuura.

Seminar

IBU hosts the  annually in March. The multi-day seminar is held for non-Japanese budō practitioners who reside in Japan, and is intended "to deepen the understanding of historical philosophic and scientific aspects of budo to increase our mutual friendship and internationalize our traditional culture". The seminar is conducted by Nippon Budokan, headquartered in Tokyo.

International relationships

IBU maintains international exchange programs on various levels with seven universities, including:
Yong In University (South Korea)
Moscow State University (Russia)
Concordia University (Oregon) (United States)
Far Eastern Federal University (Russia)
Tianjin Institute of Physical Education (China)
Hawaii Tokai International College  (United States)
National Taiwan College of Physical Education (Taiwan)

Transportation

Rail

IBU is accessible from Katsuura Station, which is served by the JR East Sotobō Line.

Katsuura Station can be reached from Tokyo Station:
1.5 hours by direct express train, or
2.5 hours by local train with a transfer at Soga Station

The campus is a 15-minute walk from the station.

Highway

IBU is accessible by highway via:
 Japan National Route 128
 Japan National Route 297

References

External links
International Budō University, Official website 
International Seminar of Budo Culture

Educational institutions established in 1984
Private universities and colleges in Japan
Universities and colleges in Chiba Prefecture
1984 establishments in Japan
Katsuura, Chiba
Sports universities and colleges